The anterior interventricular sulcus (or anterior longitudinal sulcus) is one of two grooves separating the ventricles of the heart (the other being the posterior interventricular sulcus). It is situated on the sternocostal surface of the heart, close to the left margin of the heart. It extends between the coronary sulcus, and the apex of the heart; upon reaching the diaphragmatic surface of the heart, it ends at the notch of cardiac apex. It contains the anterior interventricular branch of the left coronary artery, and great cardiac vein.

References

External links
  (image only)
 

Cardiac anatomy